Boost is a trademarked polymer used by Adidas, in the form of pellets which are compressed and molded for various shoe models the company sells, especially the Ultraboost, Energy Boost and NMD lines of sneakers. The pellets consist of proprietary thermoplastic urethane (TPU) that is formed into a small pill shape. Adidas collaborated with the German chemical company BASF to develop this material. Boost in itself is not a raw material and its characteristic bounciness is obtained by processing the thermoplastic urethane. This material is claimed to be more comfortable on the wearer's feet.

History 
Prior to its first integration into the Adidas running line in 2013, this material was developed by chemists at BASF, BASF sold its product to Adidas who integrated it into the midsoles of certain lines of their shoes. This material, commonly known as "BOOST", is Adidas' preferred alternative to other industry standards such as ethylene vinyl-acetate.

References 

Adidas
Thermoplastics